Intelligence Protection Organization of the Islamic Revolutionary Guard Corps is an Iranian intelligence agency within the Islamic Revolutionary Guard Corps (IRGC) and part of Council for Intelligence Coordination.

The agency split from Intelligence unit of IRGC in 1984, and was mainly a military intelligence unit. In 1991, the agency was restructured as an independent organization reporting to the Supreme Leader of Iran, mainly tasked with IRGC personnel surveillance and combating espionage inside the Islamic Revolutionary Guard Corps.

Chairmen

See also 
 Parallel Intelligence Agency
 Intelligence Protection Organization of Islamic Republic of Iran Army, similar agency

Notelist

References 

Iranian intelligence agencies
Iranian security organisations
Military intelligence agencies
Islamic Revolutionary Guard Corps
Counterintelligence agencies